Aomori Prefecture Route 120 (青森県道120号荒川青森停車場線 Aomori-Kendō Arakawa-Aomori Teishajō Route) is a prefecture-maintained road and a former toll road, the , in the capital of Aomori Prefecture, Aomori. It serves as an arterial highway between the Aomori Prefecture Route 27 and the central district of the city. The road is managed by the government of Aomori Prefecture.

Route description

Starting from its southern terminus at an intersection with Aomori Prefecture Route 27, Aomori Prefecture Route 120 travels north towards the central district of Aomori. It passes the main prison and library of the prefecture before coming to an intersection with the National Route 7 (Aomori Belt Highway) near Aomori-chūō Interchange. At the intersection the route passes underneath the Aomori Expressway, but there is no direct access between the expressway and Route 120. Continuing north, the road travels through a heavily commercialized area with access to many restaurants, a mall, and pachinko parlors. The road then crosses into the central district of Aomori when it is carried by a bridge over the Aoimori Railway Line. The Route 120 next has an intersection with National Route 4 where it joins it heading towards Aomori Station. While running concurrently with National Route 4, the National Highway ends and transitions to National Route 7. Shortly after this transition, Route 120 leaves the concurrency, heading north to its northern terminus at an intersection with Aomori Prefecture Route 16 (Shinmachi Street) just east of Aomori Station.

History
The route was established in 1961 as a prefecture-maintained route. In 1986 the road was upgraded to a tolled road called the Aomori-chūō Ōhashi Toll Road. The tolls on the route were removed in 2006.

List of major junctions

See also

References

Former toll roads in Japan
Roads in Aomori Prefecture
1961 establishments in Japan
2006 disestablishments in Japan